A Common Man is a 2013 Sri Lankan thriller film directed by Sri Lankan filmmaker Chandran Rutnam, starring Ben Kingsley and Ben Cross. The film is an official remake of the Indian film, A Wednesday! (2008).

A Common Man won Best Picture, Best Director and Best Actor awards at the Madrid International Film Festival and bronze medal in the Feature Films category at the New York Festivals’ International Television and Film Awards, three of the 119 Gold World Medals, 145 Silver, 104 Bronze, and 327 Finalist Certificates awarded that day.

Plot

The film starts in a room full of bomb making material and newspaper articles about LTTE bombings in Sri Lanka, the screen then cuts to a typical busy morning in Colombo. "The Man" (Ben Kingsley) plants five bombs around the city; on a public bus, in a shopping mall and the Polgoda police station, on an intercity train, and at the Katukurunda Airfield. The man then establishes his mini control station on top a skyscraper in Dehiwala and calls the police chief Morris Da Silva (Ben Cross) and informs him that if four prisoners are not released, the bombs will be detonated.

Cast
 Ben Kingsley as "The Man"
 Ben Cross as DIG Morris Da Silva
 Patrick Rutnam as IP Mohideen
 Fredrick-James Koch as IP Rangan Jayaweera
 Wilson Gunaratne as Prakash Kumar
 Veena Jayakody as Vegetable vendor
 Ashan Dias
 Sando Harris as D. Gopinath
 Teddy Vidyalankara as Pithala Nihal
 Numaya Siriwardena
 Jerome de Silva
 Wilmon Sirimanne
 Dushyanth Weeraman
 Mohammed Adamally

Production
A Common Man was filmed in 2012 in various locations in Colombo, Sri Lanka.

Release
A Common Man was released worldwide on 21 May 2013 in Blu-ray by Anchor Bay Films and Myriad Pictures.

Premiere
The movie had its premiere at the Laemmle Music Hall Cinema in Beverly Hills, California on 15 March 2013.

References

External links
 Behind the scenes of A Common Man
 
 
 A Common Man wins bronze at New York Festival

2013 films
2013 psychological thriller films
English-language Sri Lankan films
Films shot in Sri Lanka
American psychological thriller films
Sri Lankan thriller films
Films about terrorism in Asia
Films about the Sri Lankan Civil War
Films scored by Ramesh Vinayakam
Remakes of Sri Lankan films
2010s English-language films
2010s American films